Alam Khan was a Bangladeshi music director and film score composer. He has composed music for 196 films. The following is a complete list of films hes scored for:

1970s

1980s

1990s

2000s

2010s

2020s

Year Unknown

Non-film songs (Lyrics)

References

Sources
 

Discographies of Bangladeshi artists